Laurelton Hall was the home of noted artist Louis Comfort Tiffany, located in Laurel Hollow a village in the town of Oyster Bay in Long Island, New York. The 84-room mansion on 600 acres of land, designed in the Art Nouveau style, combined Islamic motifs with connection to nature, was completed in 1905, and housed many of Tiffany's most notable works, as well as serving as a work of art in and of itself. It was also commonly referred to as the "Oyster Bay estate".

History 
The mansion was 84-room and sat on 600 acres of land, designed in the Art Nouveau style, and combined Islamic motifs with nature. The mansion was completed in 1905 and housed many of Tiffany's most notable stained glass works.

On one visit to the Louis Comfort Tiffany mansion, Laurelton Hall, on June 4, 1916, Elizabeth "Bessie" Handforth Kunz wrote in the guest book: “Arabian night’s dreams vanish, at Laurelton a phantom has become reality, eternal.”  The mansion was on the North Shore of Long Island, and had at that time 1,500 acres of woodland and waterfront, and was the location of a residential school for artists, the Tiffany Art Foundation, of which Bessie’s father, Dr. George Frederick Kunz, was a trustee.

Laurelton Hall housed a school for artists run by Tiffany and his Foundation beginning in 1918. The Laurelton Hall grounds also eventually contained a separate building which housed the Tiffany Chapel originally made for the 1893 Columbian Exposition and numerous Tiffany windows, and a separate art gallery building.  Laurelton Hall eventually fell into disrepair in the years after Tiffany's death, was sold by the Foundation in 1949, and burned in 1957. The estate cost about $2,000,000 to construct and landscape and was sold for $10,000.

The majority of windows and other surviving architectural pieces were salvaged by Hugh McKean and Jeannette Genius McKean of the Charles Hosmer Morse Museum of American Art and shipped to Winter Park, Florida, after the fire.  A major retrospective of Laurelton Hall opened at New York's Metropolitan Museum of Art in November, 2006.

In 2010 the Morse Museum announced that it is building new galleries at a cost of $5 million.  The galleries will have  of space and display Tiffany work from  Laurelton Hall.

References

Further reading

External links

 Charles Hosmer Morse Museum of American Art, Winter Park, Florida
 Press Release on Metropolitan 2006-07 exhibition about Laurelton Hall
 The Louis Comfort Tiffany Foundation

Former buildings and structures in New York (state)
Mansions of Gold Coast, Long Island
Houses completed in 1905
Houses in Nassau County, New York
Oyster Bay (town), New York
Burned houses in the United States
Art Nouveau architecture in New York (state)
Tiffany Studios
1905 establishments in New York (state)
Gilded Age mansions